Harry Wood may refer to:

Harry Blanshard Wood (1882–1924), English recipient of the Victoria Cross
Harry Edwin Wood (1881–1946), South African astronomer
Harry Wood (athlete) (1902–1975), British long-distance runner
Henry Wood (cricketer, born 1853) (1853–1919), Henry "Harry" Wood, English cricketer
Harry Wood (footballer, born 1868) (1868–1951), England international footballer
Harry Wood (footballer, born 2002), English footballer for Hull City and Scunthorpe United
Harry Wood (Manitoba politician)
Harry E. Wood (1926–2009), United States federal judge
Harry O. Wood (1879–1958), American seismologist who updated the Mercalli Intensity Scale
Harry Wood (baseball) (1885–1955), American baseball player
Harry Wood (aviator) (1894–1959), World War I flying ace
Harry Harvey Wood (1903–1977), Scottish literary and artistic figure, co-founder of the Edinburgh International Festival

See also
Henry Wood (disambiguation)
Harold Wood (disambiguation)
Harry Woods (disambiguation)